The 1971 Speedway World Team Cup was the 12th edition of the FIM Speedway World Team Cup to determine the team world champions.

The final took place at Stadion Olimpijski (Wrocław) in Poland. The title was won by Great Britain for the second time.

Results

World final
 26 September
  Olympic Stadium

See also
 1971 Individual Speedway World Championship
 1971 Speedway World Pairs Championship

References

World Team
Speedway World Team Cup